The Nymboida River, a perennial stream of the Clarence River catchment, is located in the Northern Rivers region of New South Wales, Australia.

Course and features
The Nymboida River rises in the northern foothills of the Barren Mountain, on the slopes of the Great Dividing Range, within Bellinger River National Park, west of Dorrigo. Annual high rainfall on the Dorrigo Plateau produces strong river flows during most seasons.  The river flows in a meandering course generally northeast, joined by nine tributaries including the Little Murray, Bielsdown, Blicks, Little Nymboida, and Boyd rivers, before reaching its confluence with the Mann River, below Mount Gundahl, within the Nymboida National Park. The river descends  over its  course.

Flowing through Nymboi-Binderay National Park from Platypus Flat to The Junction confluence with the Little Nymboida River, there is a  section of rapid and pool sequences, making this a popular kayaking and white water rafting venue. Located  from the source is Rob Roys Falls, a  cascade while further down river lies The Silent Pool, a geological mystery where the river goes underground via a fault line and returns under a large pool.

The river is also a stronghold for the endangered Eastern Freshwater cod where it is quite common in several reaches.

Until 2012 waters released from the hydro-electric power station on the Nymboida River created one of Australia's most difficult canoe courses and as such was the site of many kayaking and canoeing competitions. Several companies offer organised rafting trips on the river.

See also

Rivers of New South Wales

References

 

Rivers of New South Wales
Northern Rivers